Staraya Russa (also Staraya Rossiya)  is an airport in Russia located 4 km southeast of Staraya Russa. It contains a large maintenance facility for Antonov and Ilyushin aircraft.  It was listed on 1974 Department of Defense Global Navigation Chart No. 3 as having jet facilities.

References
RussianAirFields.com

Airports built in the Soviet Union
Airports in Novgorod Oblast